Till Brinkmann (born 1 November 1995) is a German professional footballer who plays as a goalkeeper.

References

External links
 

Living people
1995 births
Sportspeople from Paderborn
Association football goalkeepers
German footballers
SV Lippstadt 08 players
SC Paderborn 07 II players
SC Paderborn 07 players
SV Eintracht Trier 05 players
VfB Germania Halberstadt players
SC Verl players
FC Energie Cottbus players
3. Liga players
Regionalliga players
Oberliga (football) players
Footballers from North Rhine-Westphalia